Hawkins Pharsalia is a historic home located at Ruthsburg, Queen Anne's County, Maryland, United States.  It is a -story, three-bay, single-pile gambrel-roofed brick dwelling constructed c. 1829, according to a 2015 dendrochronological study by the Oxford Tree-Ring Laboratory. It is one of the best preserved small early-19th century houses in Queen Anne's County, according to the Maryland Historical Trust. Additionally on the property is a brick smokehouse.

Hawkins Pharsalia was listed on the National Register of Historic Places in 1984.

References

External links
, including photo from 1978, at Maryland Historical Trust

Houses on the National Register of Historic Places in Maryland
Houses in Queen Anne's County, Maryland
Houses completed in 1760
National Register of Historic Places in Queen Anne's County, Maryland